Kim Dong-won (born 1962) is a South Korean film director and screenwriter. Kim's directorial debut, the comedy film My Boss, My Teacher, was a hit at the box office with more than 6.1 million admissions, making it the fourth best-selling film of 2006.

His third feature R2B: Return to Base (2012), a remake of Shin Sang-ok's 1964 film Red Scarf, is Korea's first-ever aerial action blockbuster which starred Rain.

Filmography 
My Boss, My Teacher (2006) - director, screenwriter
City of Damnation (2009) - director, screenwriter, original idea, script editor
R2B: Return to Base (2012) - director, screenwriter, executive producer

References

External links 
 
 
 

1962 births
Living people
South Korean film directors
South Korean screenwriters